The name Unding has been used for three tropical cyclones in the Philippines by PAGASA in the Western Pacific.
 
 Typhoon Rose (1965) (T6522, 27W, Unding) – approached the Philippines and struck China.
 Typhoon Kim (1977) (T7718, 19W, Unding) – struck the Northern Philippines.

Unding was retired by PAGASA after the 1977 typhoon season and replaced with Unsing for the 1981 season. It was, however, later reintroduced in the early 2000s.

 Typhoon Muifa (2004) (T0425, 29W, Unding) – Category 4 typhoon, affected the Philippines, Vietnam, Thailand, Myanmar, Malaysia

Unding was re-retired by PAGASA following the 2004 typhoon season and replaced with Ulysses in the 2008 season.

Pacific typhoon set index articles